Jakob Bornitz (Latinized, Jacobi Bornitii or Jacobus Bornitius) (c. 1560–1625) was a writer.

Bibliography
 Discursus politicus, Erfurt (1602), Neuaufl. Wittenberg (1604);
 De nummis (Vom Gelde), Hanau (1608);
 De Majestate, Leipzig (1610);
 De praemiis, (1610);
 Aerarium, Frankfurt (1612);
 Tractatus politicus De Rerum Sufficientia In Rep. et Civitate procuranda. Frankfurt (1625)

References

Further reading
 Keller, V. (2015). Jakob Bornitz and the Joy of Things. In Knowledge and the Public Interest, 1575–1725 (pp. 95–126). Cambridge: Cambridge University Press. doi:10.1017/CBO9781316273227.004

External links
 De Rerum Sufficientia

1560s births
1625 deaths